FC Saturn-1991 Saint Petersburg was a Russian football team from Saint Petersburg. It played professionally from 1992 to 1995, including 3 seasons (1993–1995) in the second-highest Russian First Division. In 1996 it merged with FC Lokomotiv Saint Petersburg. Before 1995 it was called FC Smena-Saturn Saint Petersburg.

External links
  Team history at KLISF

Association football clubs established in 1991
Association football clubs disestablished in 1996
Defunct football clubs in Saint Petersburg
1991 establishments in Russia
1996 disestablishments in Russia